Events from the year 1763 in Wales.

Incumbents
Lord Lieutenant of Anglesey - Sir Nicholas Bayly, 2nd Baronet
Lord Lieutenant of Brecknockshire and Lord Lieutenant of Monmouthshire – Thomas Morgan
Lord Lieutenant of Caernarvonshire - Thomas Wynn
Lord Lieutenant of Cardiganshire – Wilmot Vaughan, 1st Earl of Lisburne (from 27 July)
Lord Lieutenant of Carmarthenshire – George Rice
Lord Lieutenant of Denbighshire - Richard Myddelton  
Lord Lieutenant of Flintshire - Sir Roger Mostyn, 5th Baronet 
Lord Lieutenant of Glamorgan – Other Windsor, 4th Earl of Plymouth
Lord Lieutenant of Merionethshire - William Vaughan
Lord Lieutenant of Montgomeryshire – Henry Herbert, 1st Earl of Powis 
Lord Lieutenant of Pembrokeshire – Sir William Owen, 4th Baronet
Lord Lieutenant of Radnorshire – Howell Gwynne

Bishop of Bangor – John Egerton
Bishop of Llandaff – John Ewer
Bishop of St Asaph – Richard Newcome
Bishop of St Davids – Samuel Squire

Events
26 January - Herbert Lloyd, MP for Cardigan Boroughs, is created a baronet.
11 October - Hester Lynch Salusbury marries Henry Thrale, against her family's wishes.
5 December - Charles Morgan replaces Thomas Morgan (of Rhiwpera) as MP for Brecon.
Plymouth Ironworks at Merthyr Tydfil established.
Richard Penrhyn is created Baron Penrhyn

Arts and literature

New books
Goronwy Owen, Lewis Morris et al. - Diddanwch Teuluaidd
Tomshone Catty's Tricks

Music
Aaron Williams - The Universal Psalmodist

Births
1 April - John Wynne Griffith, politician (died 1834)
13 April - Robert Nicholl Carne, landowner (died 1849)
August - Peter Bailey Williams, clergyman and author (died 1836)

Deaths
18 May - Robert Williams, politician, about 68
16 July - William Morgan (of Tredegar, younger), politician, 38
25 November - Richard Morris, father of the noted Morris brothers ("Morrisiaid Môn"), 89

References

Wales
Wales